Pedro Henrique Rocha Pelágio (born 21 April 2000) is a Portuguese professional footballer who plays as a midfielder for Cypriot First Division club Pafos FC on loan from C.S. Marítimo.

Club career
Born in Funchal, Madeira, Pelágio joined C.S. Marítimo's academy at the age of 9. He made his competitive debut with the first team on 29 December 2018, playing the entire 0–1 home loss against G.D. Estoril Praia in the group stage of the Taça da Liga.

Pelágio appeared in his first match in the Primeira Liga on 5 January 2019, coming on as a late substitute in the 2–1 win over Portimonense S.C. also at the Estádio do Marítimo.

On 5 August 2022, Pelágio was loaned to Pafos FC for one year.

International career
On 3 January 2019, Pelágio received a callup to the Portugal under-19 side.

References

External links

2000 births
Living people
Sportspeople from Funchal
Portuguese footballers
Madeiran footballers
Association football midfielders
Primeira Liga players
Campeonato de Portugal (league) players
C.S. Marítimo players
Cypriot First Division players
Pafos FC players
Portugal youth international footballers
Portuguese expatriate footballers
Expatriate footballers in Cyprus
Portuguese expatriate sportspeople in Cyprus